Kordlar is a village in Shurakat-e Jonubi Rural District of Ilkhchi District, Osku County, East Azerbaijan province, Iran. At the 2006 National Census, its population was 2,654 in 678 households. The following census in 2011 counted 2,845 people in 843 households. The latest census in 2016 showed a population of 2,818 people in 944 households; it was the largest village in its rural district.

References 

Osku County

Populated places in East Azerbaijan Province

Populated places in Osku County